Jinshan Temple is a Buddhist temple located in Runzhou District of Zhenjiang, Jiangsu, China.

History

Eastern Jin dynasty
The temple was first established by Emperor Ming of Jin between 323 and 325, in the Eastern Jin dynasty (317–420).

Song dynasty
During the reign of Emperor Zhenzong (998–1022), the emperor renamed it "Longyou Temple" (Long means the emperor and You means visit) after he dreamt he visited the temple.
Then it was largely extended by abbot Foyin in the Yuanfeng period (1078–1085). 
Since Emperor Huizong (1101–1125) was a staunch Taoist, he ordered to convert many Buddhist temples into Taoist temples, the Temple became a Taoist temple and renamed "Shenxiao Yuqing Wanshou Palace". After the fall of the Northern Song dynasty (960–1127), it restored the name of "Longyou Temple".

Foyin, an accomplished monk and friend of Su Shi, settled at Jinshan Temple.

Yuan dynasty
The temple changed the name into "Jinshan Temple" in the Yuan dynasty.

Qing dynasty
In 1684, Kangxi Emperor made an inspection trip in the south, when he visited Jinshan Temple, he inscribed the plaque with the Chinese characters "Jiangtian Chan Temple".

In the 18th century, French geographer Georges-Louis Le Rouge visited the temple and painted some prints in Chinese Ancient Gardens.

Republic of China
In 1948, during the Chinese Civil War, a disastrous fire destroyed more than 200 buildings, including the Mahavira Hall, Buddhist Texts Library and abbot's room.

People's Republic of China
In 1966, Mao Zedong launched the ten-year devastating Cultural Revolution and the red guards attacked and vandalised the temple. Many of the temple's stupas were destroyed and the resident monks were forced to disrobe. Some of the monks who refused to disrobe were forced to work in the farm as labourers for nearly twenty years.

Jinshan Temple has been classified as a National Key Buddhist Temple in Han Chinese Area by the State Council of China in 1983.

Architecture

The entire complex faces the west and has an exquisite layout in the order of the Shanmen, Four Heavenly Kings Hall, Mahavira Hall, Hall of Guru, Furong Tower, Qifeng Pavilion, and Cishou Pagoda.

Four Heavenly Kings Hall
The Four Heavenly Kings Hall was first built in the Zhengtong period (1436–1449) of the Ming dynasty (1368–1644) and rebuilt in 1869 in the Tongzhi era (1862–1874) of the Qing dynasty (1644–1911). The statues of Maitreya Buddha, Skanda and Four Heavenly Kings are enshrined in the hall.

Mahavira Hall
The Mahavira Hall is rebuilt in 1989 with double-eaves gable and hip roof. The hall enshrining the statues of Three Life Buddha, namely Sakyamuni, Amitabha and Bhaisajyaguru. At the back the hall enshrines the statue of Guanyin with Shancai standing on the left and Longnü on the right. The statues of Eighteen Arhats stand on both sides of the hall. In the center of the eaves of the hall is a plaque, on which there are the words "Mahavira Hall" written by former Venerable Master of the Buddhist Association of China Zhao Puchu.

Furong Tower
The  Furong Tower is divided into upper and lower story with double-eaves gable and hip roof. Under the eaves is a plaque with the Chinese characters "Furong Tower" written by former Chinese President and General Secretary of the Communist Party Jiang Zemin.

Cishou Pagoda
The  pagoda is octagonal with seven stories. It was originally built in the Southern Dynasties (420–589) and refurbished in the Yuanfu period (1098–1100) of the Song dynasty (960–1279). The present pagoda was rebuilt in 1900, in the 26th year of Guangxu period (1875–1908) of the Qing dynasty (1644–1911).

Buddhist Texts Library
The Buddhist Texts Library was burned down in 1948. The present version was completed in 1984 with gable and hip roof.

References

Bibliography
 

Buddhist temples in Zhenjiang
Buildings and structures in Zhenjiang
Tourist attractions in Zhenjiang
20th-century establishments in China
20th-century Buddhist temples
Religious buildings and structures completed in 1990